Donald F. Cooney is a six-term elected Kalamazoo City Commissioner in Kalamazoo, Michigan, United States.  He is also a professor at Western Michigan University's School of Social Work and 2008 Democratic nominee for United States Representative of Michigan's 6th congressional district running against Republican Fred Upton. He also ran in the 2010 election.

Background
Cooney is originally from Philadelphia, Pennsylvania, where he was an ordained priest and community organizer and worked with Cesar Chavez's National Farm Workers Association. He also served at a parish in Brooklyn, New York, before being chosen to be the director of "A Better Chance" House in Swarthmore, Pennsylvania, where he helped nine disadvantaged young people win scholarships to some of the best colleges in America.

Cooney has been an associate professor at Western Michigan University's School of Social Work since 1977.  While at Western Michigan, Cooney led the South African Anti-Apartheid Movement, convincing the university to become the fourth university in the nation to divest from South Africa.  South African divestment by colleges and universities throughout the world is recognized as playing a substantial part in helping end apartheid in South Africa.  Cooney is also a 25-year member of the American Friends Service Committee's Africa Project.

As a long-standing Kalamazoo city commissioner, Cooney  helped establish the Kalamazoo Living Wage Coalition, the Poverty Reduction Initiative, and Kalamazoo Communities in Schools.

City Commissioner
Cooney was first elected to the Kalamazoo City Commission in 1997 and has been reelected every two years since, coming in third out of 16 candidates in 2011 (top seven candidates are elected to the Commission). While on the commission, Cooney has sponsored and passed two resolutions in opposition to the War in Iraq and one resolution in opposition to the PATRIOT Act. Cooney serves as Commission liaison to the Commissions and City Boards on Neighborhoods, Community Relations, and Health and Social Services.

2008 Congressional elections

He faced Republican Fred Upton in the November 4, 2008 general election.

Cooney's campaign largely focused on differences in economic and energy policy with Upton during the campaign, calling for a new, New Deal to rebuild America's human and physical infrastructure.  He has also been a vocal critic of the war in Iraq.  Cooney has large popularity in Kalamazoo.

2010 Congressional elections

References

External links
Don Cooney for U.S. Congress official campaign website
Commissioner Don Cooney official City of Kalamazoo website
 
Campaign contributions at OpenSecrets.org

Michigan Democrats
Living people
Year of birth missing (living people)